Melvin Coombs (January 30, 1948 – March 18, 1997) was a Wampanoag dancer, cultural educator, and cultural interpreter.

Early life and career
Born and raised in Mashpee, Massachusetts, Coombs' native name was Kennupmussitaccq, meaning "Quick Foot". He graduated from high school in Falmouth. After attending Cape Cod Community College in Barnstable, he began dancing competitively at local pow-wows.

Coombs later began speaking in schools and other community gatherings in an attempt to dispel myths and stereotypes about indigenous peoples of the Americas. In the 1990s, he served as a cultural interpreter at the Plimoth Plantation while working for the Wampanoag Indigenous Program. Together with his fiance, Dawn Dove, he managed the Dovecrest Cultural Center in Exeter, which includes the Tomaquag Indian Memorial Museum, the Dove Trading Post, and a cultural education program.

Death
On March 18, 1997, Coombs died of severe injuries in Richmond, Rhode Island. He and Lloyd Lance Comer, an acquaintance, were seen together drinking much of the day and night. Comer was initially charged with manslaughter, as Coombs' body was found on his property. He was later acquitted.

Personal life
At the time of his death, Coombs was engaged to Dawn Dove, a Narragansett. They lived in Exeter, Rhode Island.

References

1948 births
1997 deaths
1997 murders in the United States
20th-century Native Americans
People from Mashpee, Massachusetts
Wampanoag people
Murdered Native American people
People murdered in Rhode Island
Native American people from Massachusetts